Rhododendron aureum is a flowering plant species in the genus Rhododendron.

Larvae of Boloria freija feed on Rhododendron aureum.

R. aureum produces (-)-rhododendrol, (-)-rhododendrin, avicularin and hyperoside.

References

External links 

aureum